KCSI may refer to:

 Knight Commander of the Order of the Star of India
 KCSI (FM), a radio station (95.3 FM) licensed to Red Oak, Iowa, United States